Dartington International Summer School is a summer school and festival of music held on the medieval estate of Dartington Hall and is a department of the Dartington Trust.

Operation
First established at Bryanston School in 1948 (largely through the work of William Glock), the summer school moved to Dartington in 1953. It caters for anyone who wants to enjoy music, from conservatoire students and young professionals to enthusiastic amateurs and late starters. Internationally renowned musicians teach and direct the courses and perform concerts in the evenings, with some courses working towards student performances at the end of the week.

The summer school is unique in catering for young professionals and amateurs alongside each other in such a large range of courses. Although predominantly classical music, from early through to contemporary, other genres such as digital, world, jazz and folk are also covered. Artists and participants stay in accommodation on the Dartington Estate, with concerts taking place mainly in the old medieval banqueting hall now known as the Great Hall, and classes being taught around the medieval courtyard and in the studio buildings that used to be part of Dartington College of Arts.

External links
Dartington International Summer School
The Dartington Hall Trust

References 

Music festivals established in 1948
Music organisations based in the United Kingdom
Summer schools
Music schools in England
Music education organizations
Music festivals in Devon
Classical music festivals in England
Charities based in Devon